The 1916 Ole Miss Rebels football team represented the University of Mississippi during the 1916 college football season.

Schedule

References

Mississippi
Ole Miss Rebels football seasons
Ole Miss Rebels football